The following is a list of recurring Saturday Night Live characters and sketches introduced between September 26, 1998, and May 15, 1999, the twenty-fourth season of SNL.

Hello Dolly
An Ana Gasteyer sketch. Debuted October 3, 1998.

The How Do You Say? Ah, Yes, Show
This sketch was furnished as a talk show featuring Chris Kattan as Antonio Banderas, the show's host. Kattan portrayed Banderas as a naïve chauvinist whose only objective was to seduce every female guest into sleeping with him, using his well-documented sex appeal and shaky-at-best mastery of the English language (as evidenced in the show's title). In the show, Banderas was always backed up by his three-man mariachi band, who aside from performing the musical duties on the show, constantly begged Banderas not to unbutton or remove his shirt, for it would be "too sexy". Guest host Jennifer Love Hewitt, who was put off by his advances, questioned his amorous behaviour by asking "Aren't you married to Melanie Griffith?" His response was "Si. I am betrothed to her. She is, eh, how do you say?  Ah, yes, old and not here." Drew Barrymore did appear in a sketch as Melanie Griffith. Debuted October 17, 1998.

Dog Show
Dog Show was an aptly titled parody of an Animal Planet show featuring people who are more than enamored with their dogs. It was hosted by Miss Colleen (Molly Shannon) and Mr. David Larry (Will Ferrell), a bizarre couple who were supposed to be married even though he was a homosexual ("Separate bedrooms, separate baths"). The two admit that they "don't like most people" but are extremely fond of dogs.

The sketch would open with David Larry banging on a snare drum, followed by the two hosts shouting "DOG SHOW!" The hosts would then introduce their dogs, "Mr. Rocky Balboa" and "Mr. Bojangles", (who was actually a female, but was given the title "Mr.", because as David Larry would point out, he is "playing a trick on her"), a pair of miniature dogs who were displayed dressed in costumes. Each sketch would introduce a guest to the "show", and often the hosts would have their dogs participate in things such as seances and weddings. Debuted December 5, 1998.

Pimp Chat
Done only twice, this sketch featured Tracy Morgan as Bishop Don "Mack" Donald, a pastiche/parody/homage to Bishop Don "Magic" Juan. Both sketches featured Tim Meadows as "Pimpin' Kyle", Bishop Donald's sidekick, and took place in the back of a limo with pink faux fur upholstery, "from the back of a Rolls-Royce limousine parked outside Club Sugar Shack, at Nelson Ave. and Harlem." The first sketch featured Vince Vaughn (12/05/98) as "White Chocolate", and the second featured Ray Romano (3/13/99). As these were produced during the Clinton era, they invariably had content regarding said presidential scandals, with the occasional political questions thrown in. During these sketches, Bishop Donald would always call for the limo to slow down, at which point he would yell (to his one of his whores, presumably), "Bitch, where's my money?" Debuted December 5, 1998.

Skeeter
Skeeter is a redneck character portrayed by Darrell Hammond.

Skeeter only appeared on Saturday Night Live four times:
1. January 9, 1999 (Extreme Hunting)
2. May 3, 2003 (Politics Today)
3. January 15, 2005 (Trucker Talk)
4. March 12, 2005 (Dirtball and Burnout Convention)

Skeeter uses his catchphrase "What's up, sons of bitches?" to start a conversation. He has a mullet hairstyle. His attire consists of a white undershirt, a blue button down shirt and an orange vest jacket. He sometimes wears a dirty purple and yellow hat.

In the Politics Today sketch, we learn that Skeeter is a high school drop out and has poor knowledge of politics and current events. In the Dirtball and Burnout Convention commercial, it is revealed that Skeeter is a "four time arrestee from TV's Cops."

Brian Fellow's Safari Planet
Brian Fellow's Safari Planet was a recurring sketch on Saturday Night Live, featuring Tracy Morgan.  The character premiered on May 15, 1999, and appeared 12 times, with his last appearance on October 17, 2015.

The sketch consists of Brian Fellow (Morgan), a young animal enthusiast who hosts his own animal show. However, he is neither a licensed zoologist, nor has any degrees in any environmental sciences, and only has a sixth-grade education. Brian interviews representatives from zoos, animal sanctuaries, or other wildlife centers, who bring animals to his show, usually about two per sketch. The simple-minded Brian would either ask questions or make remarks that were completely irrelevant, or would take his guest's observations or comments out of context and become offended, causing most, if not all of his interviews to humorously fall apart, and end with Brian either throwing the guest and his or her animal out, or them walking out in frustration. Sometimes, during a second interview, Brian would actually ask an intelligent question, but would then imagine the visiting animal from the previous interview, becoming anthropomorphic (via puppetry or animation), and speaking to him, or threatening him in some way, which would distract him too much to continue the show. 

The first sketch accredited Brian Fellows with false credentials and fake experience in zoology fields, which became quickly obvious. The subsequent sketches discontinued that concept.

7 Degrees Celsius
A parody of late-1990s "Boy Bands", specifically 98 Degrees. The members were Jeph (Chris Parnell), Samm (Chris Kattan), Sweet T (Horatio Sanz), and Wade (Jimmy Fallon); the host or musical guest would appear as the fifth member (similar to Gemini's Twin). Jeph described their sound as "gangsta rap meets hip-hop meets You Can't Do That On Television."  Sweet T has a 15-year-old son named Ribeye, though adds that this doesn't make him an old dude, since he had him when he was 9.  Their manager was a man with a thinly-veiled criminal past named Peter Tanner, played by Will Ferrell. They were often seen bouncing around on large inflatable playground balls while singing, a reference to the Backstreet Boys' trademark "folding chair dance". Debuted January 16, 1999.

Chet Harper
A Ray Romano sketch. Debuted March 13, 1999.

References

Lists of recurring Saturday Night Live characters and sketches
Saturday Night Live in the 1990s
Saturday Night Live
Saturday Night Live